Issoria is a genus of butterflies in the family Nymphalidae commonly found in the Palearctic realm, Africa, and South America.

Taxonomy
The South American genus Yramea is sometimes included in Issoria as a subgenus.

Species
Listed alphabetically:
Issoria altissima (Elwes, 1882)
Issoria baileyi Huang, 1998
Issoria baumanni Rebel & Rogenhofer, 1894 – Baumann's mountain fritillary
Issoria eugenia (Eversmann, 1847)
Issoria gemmata (Butler, 1881)
Issoria hanningtoni Elwes, 1889 – Hannington's fritillary
Issoria lathonia (Linnaeus, 1758) – Queen of Spain fritillary
Issoria mackinnonii (de Nicéville, 1891)
Issoria smaragdifera (Butler, 1895) – African queen fritillary

References

 
Argynnini
Nymphalidae genera
Taxa named by Jacob Hübner